Garcinia pedunculata, popularly known as Bor Thekera (বৰ ঠেকেৰা) in Assamese, is an evergreen tree related to the more familiar purple mangosteen (Garcinia mangostana). The tree is endemic to the south-eastern regions of Asia such as parts of Myanmar and north-eastern parts of India.

Tree and fruit
The tree has a fluted trunk with short spreading branches. Leaves are lanceolate with prominent midribs. Male flowers are light green in sparsely flowered panicles. The female flowers are solitary. The roundish fruit has a diameter ranging between 8 and 12 cm. It has a juicy interior with edible arils.

Uses

The ripe fruit is eaten cooked or raw. Usually the ripe or raw fruits are sliced, sun-dried and preserved. In the state of Assam, such slices are much valued and used for preparing delicacies like "tenga diya masor jol" meaning Assamese sour fish curry. It can also be prepared with other vegetables, especially fritters made with lentils.

References

See also
 Mangosteen
 Garcinia assamica
 Garcinia xanthochymus
 Garcinia cowa
 Garcinia lanceifolia
 Garcinia morella

Fruit vegetables
pedunculata